San Nicolas Island (Spanish: Isla de San Nicolás; Tongva: Haraasnga) is the most remote of the Channel Islands, off of Southern California, 61 miles (98 km) from the nearest point on the mainland coast. It is part of Ventura County. The 14,562 acre (58.93 km2 or 22.753 sq mi) island is currently controlled by the United States Navy and is used as a weapons testing and training facility, served by Naval Outlying Landing Field San Nicolas Island. The uninhabited island is defined by the United States Census Bureau as Block Group 9, Census Tract 36.04 of Ventura County, California. The Nicoleño Native American tribe inhabited the island until 1835.  As of the 2000 U.S. Census, the island has since remained officially uninhabited, though the census estimates that at least 200 military and civilian personnel live on the island at any given time. The island has a small airport, though the  runway is the second longest in Ventura County (slightly behind the  one at the Naval Air Station Point Mugu). Additionally, there are several buildings including telemetry reception antennas.

History
Archaeological evidence suggests that San Nicolas Island has been occupied by humans for at least 10,000 years. For thousands of years, San Nicolas was the home of the Nicoleño people, who were probably related to the Tongva of the mainland and Santa Catalina Island. It was named for Saint Nicholas by Spanish explorer Sebastián Vizcaíno after he sighted the island on the saint's feast day (December 6) in 1602. Russians called the island Il'men, after the name of the maritime fur trade ship that reached it, Il’mena. The Nicoleños were forcibly removed in the early 19th century by the padres of the California mission system. Within a few years of their removal from the island, the Nicoleño people and their unique language became extinct.

Lone Woman of San Nicolas Island

The most famous resident of San Nicolas Island was the "Lone Woman of San Nicolas Island", christened Juana Maria; her birth name was never known to anyone on the mainland. She was left behind (explanations for this vary) when the rest of the Nicoleños were moved to the mainland. She resided on the island alone for 18 years before she was found by Captain George Nidever and his crew in 1853 and taken to Santa Barbara. Her story is famously fictionalized in the award-winning children's novel Island of the Blue Dolphins by Scott O'Dell.

Whaling
The steam-schooner California and its two whale catchers Hawk and Port Saunders operated off San Nicolas in 1932 and 1937, catching about 30 fin whales off the island from October to early December in the former year.

Munitions testing
San Nicolas Island was one of eight candidate sites to detonate the first atomic bomb before White Sands Proving Ground was selected for the Trinity nuclear test. Between 1957 and 1973, and in 2004 and again in 2010, U.S. military research rockets were launched from San Nicolas Island. It remains part of the Pacific Missile Range.

San Nicolas Island currently serves as a detachment of Naval Base Ventura County. In addition to the Port Hueneme and Point Mugu, San Nicolas Island is military-owned and operated.

Geography
The highest point is Jackson Hill, with an elevation of 907 feet above sea level.

Geology
Composed primarily of Eocene sandstone and shale, much of the island also has marine terrace deposits of Pleistocene age, indicating that it was probably completely submerged at that time. The entire western part of the island is covered with reddish-brown eolian dune deposits laid down during the early Holocene. In some places these deposits are more than 10 meters deep. Small quantities of volcanic rocks (primarily andesite) exist on the southeast end of the island.

Stone available to natives for tool making on San Nicolas Island was largely limited to metavolcanic (including porphyritic metavolcanic) and metasedimentary (mainly quartzite) rock. The metavolcanics are found in the form of cobbles within conglomerates and cobble-bearing mudstones. This material is dense and not easily workable.

Climate
Under the Köppen climate classification, San Nicolas Island features a semi-arid climate (Köppen BSk) with mediterranean characteristics. Temperatures above  are rare, occurring on 2 days per summer. On average, there are 36 days with measurable precipitation.

Biota

Flora 
There is little ecological diversity on San Nicolas Island. The island was heavily grazed by sheep until they were removed in 1943. Overgrazing and erosion have removed much of the topsoil from the island. Despite the degradation, three endemic plants are found on the island: Astragalus traskiae, Eriogonum grande subspecies timorum, and Lomatium insulare.

The dominant plant community on the island is coastal bluff scrubland, with giant coreopsis (Coreopsis gigantea) and coyote brush (Baccharis pilularis) the most visible components. The few trees present today, including California fan palms (Washingtonia filifera) were introduced in modern times. However, early written accounts and the remains of ancient plants in the form of  calcareous root casts indicate that, prior to 1860, brush covered a portion of the island.

Fauna 

There are only three species of endemic land vertebrates on the island: the island night lizard (Xantusia riversiana), deer mouse (Peromyscus maniculatus exterus), and island fox (Urocyon littoralis dickeyi). Two other reptiles, the common side-blotched lizard (Uta stansburiana), and the southern alligator lizard (Elgaria multicarinatus), were at one time thought to be endemic, but an analysis of mitochondrial DNA indicates that both species were most likely introduced in recent times.

More than 10 endemic molluscs are known only from San Nicolas Island. These are Binneya notabilis, Catinella rehderi, Haplotrema duranti duranti, Micrarionta feralis, Micrarionta micromphala, M. opuntia, M. sodalis, Nearctula rowellii longii, Sterkia clementina, and Xerarionta tryoni (ssp. tryoni and hemphilli).

Large numbers of birds can be found on San Nicolas Island. Two species are of particular ecological concern: the western gull (Larus occidentalis) and Brandt's cormorant (Phalacrocorax penicillatus), which are threatened by island foxes.

Conservation and restoration

The common housecat was one of the greatest threats to the island's wildlife until they were eradicated from the island by the US Navy with the support of Island Conservation and the Humane Society of the United States in 2009. The cats killed cormorants, gulls, and the island night lizard and competed with the endemic Island fox. The cats arrived on the island before 1952, probably brought by navy officers who worked there. All cats were relocated to a specially prepared habitat in Ramona, in San Diego County with the assistance of the Humane Society of the United States. Cats were officially declared eradicated in 2012. The eradication effort took 18 months and cost $3 million.

References

External links

 
CNIC NBVC website
Rocket launches at San Nicolas Island
GlobalSecurity.org: San Nicolas Island
Photo of Juana Maria's Whalebone Hut
 

Islands of the Channel Islands of California
Islands of Ventura County, California
Rocket launch sites in the United States
Islands of Southern California
Islands of California
Island restoration